Martina Merz (born March 1, 1963), is a German engineer who in 2019 became the Chief executive officer (CEO) of ThyssenKrupp, and has been called "the most powerful woman in the German economy".

Education 
Merz studied manufacturing Engineering and holds a Bachelor of Science from Baden-Württemberg Cooperative State University in Stuttgart.

Career 
Merz started her career in 1985, taking up different management positions at Robert Bosch GmbH. In 2002, she joined Brose Fahrzeugteile as Executive Vice President, and returned to Bosch in 2005. From 2012, Merz worked as Chief executive officer (CEO) for Chassis Brakes International. From 2015 to 2019, Merz worked as an independent business consultant with memberships in the supervisory boards of Lufthansa, SAF-Holland, Imerys and Volvo.

In February 2019, Merz was elected Chairwoman of the Supervisory Board of thyssenkrupp AG. Martina Merz has been CEO of thyssenkrupp AG since October 1, 2019.

Other activities

Corporate boards 
 Imerys, Member of the Board of Directors
 Volvo, Member of the Supervisory Board (since 2015
 SAF-Holland, Member of Board of the Directors
 Bekaert, Member of the Board of Directors (2016-2019) 
 Lufthansa, Member of the Supervisory Board (2016-2020)

Non-profit organizations 
 Federation of German Industries (BDI), Member of the Presidium (since 2021)
 Baden-Badener Unternehmer-Gespräche (BBUG), Member of the Board of Trustees (since 2021)
 European Round Table of Industrialists (ERT), Member

References

External links 
  Martina Merz, Thyssenkrupp website

1963 births
German chief executives
21st-century German engineers
21st-century German businesspeople
ThyssenKrupp
Living people
Engineers from Stuttgart